Riadh Bettaieb (born 1961) is a Tunisian politician. He serves as the Minister of Investment and International Cooperation under Prime Minister Hamadi Jebali.

Biography

Early life
Riadh Bettaieb was born on 3 January 1961 in Ben Gardane. He graduated from the National School of Engineers.

Political activism and career
In 1979, he joined the Ennahda Movement. In 1991, he was forced into exile in Paris by the regime of Zine El Abidine Ben Ali. He was the Head of the Paris-based Tunisian Solidarity Association. After former President Ben Ali was deposed in 2011, he returned to Tunisia and joined the High Authority for the Achievement of the Revolution’s Objectives. He also serves as a Governor of the European Bank for Reconstruction and Development.

Minister
On 20 December 2011, he joined the Jebali Cabinet as Minister of Investment and International Cooperation. In May 2012, he said Tunisia and Malaysia would develop halal agriculture, medications and cosmetics together. He also suggested Tunisian companies would invest in Qatar.

References

Living people
1961 births
Tunisian Muslims
Government ministers of Tunisia
Ennahda politicians
Tunisian exiles
Tunisian expatriates in France
People from Medenine Governorate
People from Ben Gardane